Charles Edward Brown (born September 13, 1942) is a former American football defensive back in the National Football League (NFL) for the Chicago Bears. He played college football at Syracuse University, and in 1968, he played in the American Football League (AFL) for the Buffalo Bills. He finished his career in the Canadian Football League in 1969 with the Hamilton Tiger-Cats, where he returned an interception for 115 yards and a touchdown, at the time the second longest, and now the fifth longest return in league history.

See also
List of American Football League players

References

1942 births
Living people
People from Heflin, Alabama
Players of American football from Alabama
American football defensive backs
Syracuse Orange football players
Chicago Bears players
Buffalo Bills players
Hamilton Tiger-Cats players
American Football League players